The 1926 South Carolina gubernatorial election was held on November 2, 1926, to select the governor of the state of South Carolina. The South Carolina constitution was amended in 1926 to change the term of governor from two years to four years, but also prohibiting governors from consecutive terms. John Gardiner Richards, Jr. won the contested Democratic primary and ran unopposed in the general election becoming the 96th governor of South Carolina.

Democratic primary
The South Carolina Democratic Party held their primary for governor in the summer of 1926 and it attracted many politicians because of the recent change to the South Carolina constitution providing for a four-year term. Richards emerged victorious from the runoff and effectively became the next governor of South Carolina because there was no opposition in the general election.

General election
The general election was held on November 2, 1926, and John Richards was elected the next governor of South Carolina without opposition thanks to the state's suppression of parties other than the ruling Democrats. Being a non-presidential election and few contested races, turnout was the lowest ever for a gubernatorial election in South Carolina.

 

|-
| 
| colspan=5 |Democratic hold
|-

See also
Governor of South Carolina
List of governors of South Carolina
South Carolina gubernatorial elections

References
"Report of the Secretary of State to the General Assembly of South Carolina.  Part II." Reports of State Officers Boards and Committees to the General Assembly of the State of South Carolina. Volume I. Columbia, South Carolina: 1927, p. 57.

External links
SCIway Biography of Governor John Gardiner Richards, Jr.

1926 United States gubernatorial elections
1926
Gubernatorial
November 1926 events